Pollicis brevis muscle may refer to:

 Abductor pollicis brevis muscle
 Extensor pollicis brevis muscle
 Flexor pollicis brevis muscle